Robert Thomas Hennemeyer (December 1, 1925 Chicago, Illinois - August 21, 2017 Bethesda, Maryland) “embarked on an illustrious thirty-five year career” in 1952 when he entered the US Foreign Service.

Hennemeyer served as Consul General in Germany twice and was the US Ambassador in The Gambia (1984-1986).  He taught at the US Naval Academy.  While in Tanganyika, he was taken hostage “during an army mutiny in then Tanganyika and narrowly escaped being executed by firing squad.”

He received his Bachelors and master's degrees at the University of Chicago and studied at Oxford University.

Publications
 Forgiveness in International Politics: An Alternative Road to Peace co-author with William Bole and Drew Christiansen

References

American non-fiction writers
Ambassadors of the United States to the Gambia
United States Naval Academy faculty
University of Chicago alumni
1925 births
2017 deaths